The  was an aircraft and airbase garrison unit of the Imperial Japanese Navy (IJN) during the Pacific campaign of World War II. This air group was organised for specializes in suicide attack. Another known as God thunder Corps (Jinrai Butai).

Structure
Higher unit
Yokosuka Naval District (1 October 1944–14 November 1944)
Combined Fleet (15 November 1944–19 December 1944)
11th Air Flotilla (20 December 1944–9 February 1945)
5th Air Fleet (10 February 1945–21 August 1945, dissolved.)
Lower unit
Attack bomber Squadron (1 October 1944–14 November 1944)
Renamed 711th Attack Squadron on 15 November 1944.
Ohka Squadron (1 October 1944–21 August 1945)
Suisei Squadron (15 November 1944–14 February 1945)
Aircraft and airmen were moved to 722nd Naval Air Group on 15 February 1945.
305th Fighter Squadron (1 February 1945–19 August 1945)
306th Fighter Squadron (15 November 1944–19 August 1945)
307th Fighter Squadron (1 February 1945–19 August 1945)
708th Attack Squadron (20 December 1944–21 August 1945)
711th Attack Squadron (15 November 1944–5 May 1945, dissolved.)
Aircraft and airmen were moved to the 708th Attack Squadron on 5 May 1945.
Kamikaze
Shinken Unit
Shichisei Unit
Tsukuba Unit
Shōwa Unit
Commanding officer
Capt. Motoharu Okamura (50) - 1 October 1944 - 30 September 1945

See also
List of Imperial Japanese Navy air-to-surface special attack units
Mitsubishi G4M
Yokosuka MXY7 Ohka

Bibliography
Atene Shobō, Tōkyō, Japan.
Navy battle record of special attack units, Author: each air unit of the Imperial Japanese Navy, reprinted in 2001, .
Bunrin-Dō Co., Ltd., Tōkyō, Japan.
Famous Airplanes of the World No. 59, Type 1 Attack Bomber, 1996, .
Famous Airplanes of the World, Special Edition Vol. 6, Type Zero Carrier Fighter, 2012, .
Koku-Fan Illustrated No. 42, Japanese Imperial Army & Navy Aircraft Color, Marking, 1988.
Koku-Fan Illustrated Special, Japanese Military Aircraft Illustrated Vol. 2, "Bombers", 1982.
Gakken, Tōkyō, Japan.
Hiroshi Katō, How the Gods of Thunder unit turned out, 2009, .
Model Art Co. Ltd., Tōkyō, Japan.
Model Art No. 406, Special issue Camouflage & Markings of Imperial Japanese Navy Bombers in W.W.II, 1993.
Model Art No. 458, Special issue Imperial Japanese Navy Air Force Suicide Attack Unit "Kamikaze", 1995.
Model Art No. 510, Special issue Camouflage & Markings of the I.J.N. Fighters, 1998.
Model Art No. 525, Special issue Shūsui and Jet aircraft / Rocket aircraft of the Imperial Japanese Army and Navy, 1998.
Model Art No. 847, Special issue Model Art Profile No. 12, "A6M of IJN (Part 1)", 2012.
Model Art No. 857, Special issue Model Art Profile No. 13, "A6M of IJN (Part 2)", 2012.
Ushio Shobō, Tōkyō, Japan.
The Maru Special No. 108, Kamikaze Special Attack Forces, 1986.
The Maru Mechanic No. 46, Naval Aero-Technical Arsenal Bomber "Ginga" P1Y / Mitsubishi Type 1 Attack Bomber G4M (Betty), 1984.

Groups of the Imperial Japanese Navy Air Service
Japanese World War II special forces
Military units and formations established in 1944
Military units and formations disestablished in 1945